Pithocarpa is a genus of Australian plants in the pussy's-toes tribe within the daisy family.

 Species
 Pithocarpa corymbulosa Lindl. - Western Australia
 Pithocarpa pulchella Lindl. - Western Australia

References

Flora of Western Australia
Gnaphalieae
Asteraceae genera